Eat, Sleep, Repeat is the third full-length release and major label debut from Lakeland, Florida's Copeland. It was recorded at Glow in the Dark in Atlanta during June and July 2006. "We always said that we would only consider working with a label that was passionate about our band and our music, and the folks at Columbia are just that," the band said in a blog on its MySpace page. "Nothing drastic will change other than the fact that hopefully a few more ears will get to hear our music."

Track listing
 "Where's My Head" – 2:16 (A. Marsh)
 "Eat, Sleep, Repeat" – 5:00 (A. Marsh, B. Laurenson)
 "Control Freak" – 3:49 (A. Marsh, B. Laurenson)
 "Careful Now" – 3:39 (A. Marsh)
 "Love Affair" – 5:31 (A. Marsh)
 "I'm Safer in an Airplane" – 2:55 (A. Marsh)
 "By My Side" – 3:20 (A. Marsh, B. Laurenson)
 "Cover What You Can" – 2:00 (A. Marsh)
 "The Last Time He Saw Dorie" – 3:57 (A. Marsh)
 "I'm a Sucker for a Kind Word" – 3:53 (A. Marsh, B. Laurenson)
 "When You Thought You'd Never Stand Out" – 5:47 (A. Marsh)
 "Chin Up" - 3:13 (only featured on the Japanese edition and special versions exclusive to Circuit City)

Personnel

Aaron Marsh - vocals, guitars, keyboards
Bryan Laurenson - guitars, keyboards
Jonathan Bucklew - drums
James Likeness - bass, layout and design
Aaron Marsh and Matt Goldman - production
Matt Goldman and Bryan Laurenson - mixing
Matt Malpass - additional engineering
Gavin Lurssen - mastering (at The Mastering Lab)
Anna Becker - additional vocals
Rachel Plating - violin and viola
Robert Hugel - French horn and video documentary
Justin Spears - trumpet and flugelhorn
Kyle Griner - management
Nick Storch - booking
James Douglas Adams - painting and illustrations

References

External links
 

Copeland (band) albums
2006 albums
The Militia Group albums
Albums produced by Matt Goldman